KBKG (93.5 FM) is a radio station  broadcasting a classic hits format, licensed to Corning, Arkansas, United States. The station is currently owned by Shields-Adkins Broadcasting. The station has obtained a construction permit from the FCC for a power increase to 12,000 watts.

References

External links
 Official Website
 

BKG